Albert Edward McPhillips (21 March 1861 – 24 January 1938) was a Canadian politician and a barrister.

Early years
He was the son of George McPhillips (born Co. Monaghan, 1805–1878) and Margaret Lavin (born Co. Armagh), both of whom were Irish and he was the youngest of six boys. His father and three brothers were land surveyors.  His brother, George McPhillips Jr. (1848–1913) is commemorated by McPhillips Street in Winnipeg.

Military service
McPhillips held a second class certificate from Toronto School of Infantry. He was a lieutenant in the 90th Battalion, Royal Winnipeg Rifles, during the North-West Rebellion in 1885. He fought at the Battle of Fish Creek and Battle of Batoche and received a medal bar and clasp. He retired in 1890 with the rank of captain.

Law and political career
McPhillips was called to the Bar in Manitoba, in Trinity Term in 1882, and to the Bar of British Columbia in 1891. He was a member of Legislative assembly for British Columbia, serving Victoria City from 1898 to 1903, and The Islands from 1907 to 1912.  He was Attorney General of British Columbia, resigning on 5 November 1903. McPhillips sat on the British Columbia Court of Appeal as a judge from 1913, serving up until his death in 1938.

Personal life
In 1896, he married Sophia Emily Davie, daughter of the late Hon. A.E.B. Davie Q.C. and had 3 children. His youngest son Albert McPhillips was also a barrister and politician.

Arms

References

1864 births
Attorneys General of British Columbia
Lawyers in British Columbia
Judges in British Columbia
Canadian people of Irish descent
People of the North-West Rebellion
1938 deaths